Jurinella is a genus of bristle flies in the family Tachinidae. There are at least 50 described species in Jurinella.

Species
These 52 species belong to the genus Jurinella:

 Jurinella abodminalis (Townsend, 1914) c g
 Jurinella abscondens (Townsend, 1914) c g
 Jurinella anax Curran, 1947 c g
 Jurinella andicola Townsend, 1914 c g
 Jurinella apicata Curran, 1947 c g
 Jurinella ariel Curran, 1947 c g
 Jurinella baoruco Woodley, 2007 c g
 Jurinella bella Curran, 1947 c g
 Jurinella bicolor (Wiedemann, 1830) c
 Jurinella caeruleonigra (Macquart, 1846) c g
 Jurinella circularis Curran, 1947 c g
 Jurinella connota Curran, 1947 c g
 Jurinella corpulenta (Townsend, 1927) c
 Jurinella crossi (Blanchard, 1942) c g
 Jurinella debitrix (Walker, 1860) c g
 Jurinella egle Curran, 1947 c g
 Jurinella epileuca Walker, 1849 c g
 Jurinella feminea Curran, 1947 c g
 Jurinella ferruginea Townsend, 1929 c g
 Jurinella fuscicornis Curran, 1925 c g
 Jurinella gertschi Curran, 1947 c g
 Jurinella gigantea (Townsend, 1932) c g
 Jurinella huntingtoni Curran, 1947 c g
 Jurinella jicaltepecia Townsend, 1931 c g
 Jurinella jujuyensis (Blanchard, 1941) c g
 Jurinella koehleri (Blanchard, 1941) c
 Jurinella lata Curran, 1947 c g
 Jurinella lutzi Curran, 1947 i c g b
 Jurinella maculata Vimmer & Soukup, 1940 c g
 Jurinella major Curran, 1925 c g
 Jurinella mexicana Curran, 1947 c g
 Jurinella milleri Curran, 1947 c g
 Jurinella minuta Curran, 1947 c g
 Jurinella niveisquamma (Engel, 1920) c g
 Jurinella obesa (Wiedemann, 1830) c g
 Jurinella palpalis Curran, 1947 c g
 Jurinella panamena Curran, 1947 c g
 Jurinella pilosa Drury, 1773 c g
 Jurinella pollinosa (Wulp, 1888) c g
 Jurinella procteri Curran, 1947 c g
 Jurinella producta Curran, 1947 c g
 Jurinella profusa Curran, 1947 c g
 Jurinella reducta Curran, 1947 c g
 Jurinella rufiventris Vimmer & Soukup, 1940 c g
 Jurinella salla Curran, 1947 c g
 Jurinella schwarzi Curran, 1947 c g
 Jurinella spinosa (Townsend, 1927) c
 Jurinella thoracica Curran, 1925 c g
 Jurinella vaga Curran, 1947 c g
 Jurinella vargas Curran, 1947 c g
 Jurinella varians Curran, 1947 c g
 Jurinella zeteki Curran, 1947 c g

Data sources: i = ITIS, c = Catalogue of Life, g = GBIF, b = Bugguide.net

References

Tachininae
Tachinidae genera
Taxa named by Friedrich Moritz Brauer
Taxa named by Julius von Bergenstamm